The Northern Regional Football League Championship, currently known as Lotto Sport Italia NRFL Championship for sponsorship reasons, is a semi-professional New Zealand association football league competition. Up until 2022, the competition was known as NRFL Division 1.

The league includes football clubs located in the northern part of the North Island, with clubs from the Northland, Auckland, Waikato and Bay of Plenty provinces. The league sits at step 3 of the New Zealand football pyramid.

Current clubs

Waiheke United and North Shore United joined the league following their relegation the season prior from the Northern League. Hibiscus Coast were promoted as winners of NRFL Division 2, with Ngaruawahia United also promoted.

West Coast Rangers won the 2022 season and were promoted alongside Manurewa to the Northern League, while Albany United and Waitemata were relegated to NRFL Northern Conference.

Past winners
Numbers in parentheses indicate wins up to that date.

References

External links
Auckland Football Federation
NRFL Football League
Northern League

2
NRFL Championship
3
Sports leagues established in 1965
1965 establishments in New Zealand